Goodspeed Airport  is located in East Haddam, Connecticut, United States. It has been under new ownership with the support of the Recreational Aviation Foundation since November 2020. The new owners, Eric Zipkin and Bill McEnery, plan to revitalize the airport and bring back the vibrant aviation community that once existed there.

Facilities and aircraft
Goodspeed Airport is situated 1 mile southeast of the central business district, and contains two runways.  The longest runway, 16/34, is water measuring 4,500 x 1,000 ft (1372 x 305 m). A second runway, 14/32, paved with asphalt, measures 2,120 x 50 ft (646 x 15 m).

The airport has been featured in videos and articles by a number of prominent aviation figures and organizations, including Matt Guthmiller and AOPA, mainly centering on its somewhat unusual position and approaches, and its short paved runway, as well as the nearby Goodspeed Opera House and the town of East Haddam.

For the 12-month period ending April 30, 2010, the airport had 6,188 aircraft operations, an average of 119 per week: 80% local general aviation, and 19% transient general aviation. At that time there were 33 aircraft based at this airport: 87% single-engine and 4% multi-engine, and 9% ultra-light.

The largest aircraft to ever land at Goodspeed Airport is the Douglas DC-3, which has been brought in by the Tunison Foundation several times as a visiting exhibit.

Revitalization Plan
In the fall of 2020, Goodspeed Airport was acquired by New England Airport Associates, LLC, a partnership between Eric Zipkin, Bill McEnery, and the Recreational Aviation Foundation, from Timothy Mellon, who purchased the airport in 1999 for $2.33 million. Both Zipkin and McEnery are pilots and aircraft owners who had previously stored aircraft at the airport; McEnery owns the Pedal Power line of bicycle shops, while Zipkin is the founder of Tradewind Aviation. Initial plans to revitalize the airport include making Avgas available again, as well as installing previously permitted seaplane docks. Zipkin and McEnery hope that the airport will see renewed aviation activity. Property development is limited by a conservation easement, so major structural changes to the airport will not occur.

As of August 2022, the airport has attracted renewed community interest, including hosting various local events, and now has both a seaplane flight school (Learn 2 Fly CT) and maintenance facility (Goodspeed Aero Craft) on-site.

References

Airports in Connecticut
Transportation buildings and structures in Middlesex County, Connecticut
East Haddam, Connecticut